Area C may refer to: 

 Area C (West Bank), one of the three administrative divisions of the West Bank, set out in the Oslo Accords
 Area C mine,  an iron ore mine located in the Pilbara region of Western Australia
 Milan Area C, a congestion charge scheme implemented in the city of Milan